Mafand Ab (also Romanized as Māfand Āb; also known as Māqandāb) is a village in Kahshang Rural District, in the Central District of Birjand County, South Khorasan Province, Iran. At the 2016 census, its population was 34, in 14 families.

References 

Populated places in Birjand County